Granholm v. Heald, 544 U.S. 460 (2005), was a court case decided by the Supreme Court of the United States in a 5–4 decision that ruled that laws in New York and Michigan that permitted in-state wineries to ship wine directly to consumers but prohibited out-of-state wineries from doing the same were unconstitutional. The case was unusual because the arguments centered on the rarely-invoked Twenty-First Amendment to the Constitution, ratified in 1933, which ended Prohibition in the United States.

Background
Granholm v. Heald was the conclusion of an eight-year fight by small wineries against such laws. Although direct shipments to consumers constituted only about 2% of wine sales in the United States (whose total sales were $21.6 billion in 2003), direct sales were thought to be an opportunity for growth. Laws varied from state to state, but typically, a winery could distribute wine only by selling it to a wholesaler in the state. Retailers were then required to purchase from the wholesalers. That made the large wholesalers very powerful in the wine industry since if wholesalers in New York decided not to purchase wine from a particular winery, that winery would be completely shut out of the New York market.

Arguments
The court case, which was a consolidation of two separate lawsuits, pitted the Dormant Commerce Clause doctrine, inferred from the Constitution's Article I, against Section 2 of the Twenty-First Amendment, which reads:
The transportation or importation into any State, Territory, or possession of the United States for delivery or use therein of intoxicating liquors, in violation of the laws thereof, is hereby prohibited.
The Commerce Clause of Article 1 of the Constitution grants Congress the power:
To regulate Commerce with foreign Nations, and among the several States, and with the Indian Tribes.

In turn, the Dormant Commerce Clause (DCC) has been inferred from the Commerce Clause. The DCC is a doctrine that had evolved over many decisions of the US Supreme Court that states do not have the power to enact anticompetitive laws that discriminate against sellers in other states without the permission of Congress.

Eleanor Heald, a wine collector, and eleven other plaintiffs, argued that Michigan's Liquor Control Code violated the DCC by making it a misdemeanor for an out-of-state winery to ship wine directly to a Michigan resident but did not prohibit direct shipping by in-state wineries. The same argument was made in a separate case against the government of New York State by Juanita Swedenburg and other owners of out-of-state wineries.

In both cases, the state governments of Michigan and New York had argued that Section 2 of the Twenty-First Amendment granted them carte blanche to regulate liquor. One of their justifications for the laws was that by regulating out-of-state wineries that way, they might be able to hinder the shipment of alcohol to underage minors, which would serve a valid state purpose.

The government of New York had won in the federal Second Circuit Court, and the government of Michigan had lost in the Sixth Circuit. The cases were consolidated and heard together by the US Supreme Court.

In a 5–4 decision, the Supreme Court decided the states' laws were unconstitutional. The context of the Twenty-First Amendment was to return to the status quo that had existed before Prohibition. The Court made it clear that states have the power to regulate alcohol however they wished, including banning alcoholic beverages entirely within the state. Before Prohibition, the states did not have the power to violate the Dormant Commerce Clause, and the Twenty-First Amendment was not intended to grant them that power.

Aftermath
Michigan's liquor control board announced that it would recommend to the state government to ban all direct wine sales to consumers, which would join the 15 other states that currently ban all such sales.

New York Governor George Pataki unveiled a bill that would limit each winery's direct sales to consumers to two cases per month per consumer. As a Wall Street Journal editorial noted, two cases per month is a relatively large amount of wine for a consumer, but the measure was intended to reduce competition for New York alcohol distributors.  New York State enacted a bill in 2006 that allows direct shipment of wine to consumers on a reciprocal basis. New York residents can purchase wine that is shipped from a state that grants New York wineries the same rights.

Since the ruling, many more states have allowed direct shipping from wineries. According to the Wine Institute, a public policy advocacy association of California wineries, 37 states permitted at least some form of direct shipping from wineries to consumers, as of July 2010. Different states have enacted different regulations. An editorial article on the commercial wine selling web site Appellation America states that many of the conditions in those regulations are so complex or so expensive that they discourage wineries from complying.

In March 2011, a bill was introduced in the US House of Representatives that would explicitly allow states to regulate alcohol products from outside of the state differently from those produced within the state.

See also
 List of United States Supreme Court cases, volume 544
List of United States Supreme Court cases
 Twenty-first Amendment to the United States Constitution

References

External links
Web page on the case, including evidence and briefs, by Alex Tanford, an attorney involved in the litigation
Article  on the case (while it was still underway) from the Medill School of Journalism
Law Journal article  published prior to the Supreme Court argument

United States Constitution Article One case law
United States Supreme Court cases
United States Twenty-first Amendment case law
United States Dormant Commerce Clause case law
Alcohol law in the United States
2005 in United States case law
Legal history of Michigan
United States Supreme Court cases of the Rehnquist Court
Michigan wine
New York (state) wine